Belá-Dulice is a village and municipality in Martin District in the Žilina Region of northern Slovakia.

History
In historical records the village was first mentioned in 1282.

Geography
The municipality lies at an altitude of 530 metres and covers an area of 51.172 km². It has a population of about 1230 people.

Genealogical resources

The records for genealogical research are available at the state archive "Statny Archiv in Bytca, Slovakia"

 Roman Catholic church records (births/marriages/deaths): 1777-11949 (parish B)
 Lutheran church records (births/marriages/deaths): 1689-1895 (parish B)

See also
 List of municipalities and towns in Slovakia

References

External links
https://web.archive.org/web/20070427022352/http://www.statistics.sk/mosmis/eng/run.html
Surnames of living people in BelaDulice

Villages and municipalities in Martin District